SMS V187 was a S-138-class large torpedo boat of the Imperial German Navy. She was built by the AG Vulcan shipyard at Stettin between 1910 and 1911 and launched on 11 January 1911.

V187 was still in service at the start of the First World War, but was sunk by British cruisers and destroyers at the Battle of Heligoland Bight on 28 August 1914.

Construction and design
The Imperial German Navy ordered 12 large torpedo boats (Große Torpedoboote) as part of the fiscal year 1910 shipbuilding programme, with one half-flotilla of six ships (V186–V191) ordered from AG Vulcan and the other six ships from Germaniawerft. The two groups of torpedo boats were of basically similar layout but differed slightly in detailed design, with a gradual evolution of design and increase in displacement with each year's orders.

The V186 and G192 groups of torpedo boats had their forecastles cut back to allow their forward pair of torpedo tubes to fire directly ahead, but this made the ships very wet in high seas, and V187 was modified with the forecastle lengthened and the forward set of torpedo tubes moved aft of the forecastle break and the ship's bridge.

The ship was armed with two 8.8 cm L/45 guns, one on the Forecastle and one aft. Four single 50 cm (19.7 in) torpedo tubes were fitted, with two forward, one between the ship's two funnels, and one aft of the funnels. The ship had a crew of 84 officers and men.

V187 was laid down at AG Vulcan's Stettin shipyard as Yard number 305 and was launched on 11 January 1911 and completed on 4 May 1911.

Service
On commissioning, V187 joined I Torpedo Flotilla as leader, and remained the leader of I Flotilla in 1914.

First World War

On 28 August 1914, the  British Harwich Force, supported by light cruisers and battlecruisers of the Grand Fleet, carried out  a raid towards Heligoland with the intention of destroying patrolling German torpedo boats. Four German light cruisers and another flotilla of torpedo boats (V Torpedo Boat Flotilla) was in the vicinity of Heligoland. V187, the leader of I Torpedo Boat Flotilla, formed part of the outer screen of torpedo boats. At about 06:00 on 28 August, another member of the outer screen reported spotting the periscope of a submarine. As a result, V Flotilla was ordered out to hunt the hostile submarine. At 07:57 G194 was fired on by British warships, and was soon retreating towards Heligoland, pursued by four British destroyers.

V187 headed eastwards towards Heligoland in poor visibility when she encountered four British destroyers (and ) coming from the east at about 09:25 hr, and turned southwards towards the Jade estuary with the four destroyers in pursuit. V187 managed to dash past the four British destroyers without damage, but then found a second division of four destroyers (and ) ahead. Trapped between two groups of destroyers, V187 was taken under heavy fire at close range which disabled the ship's machinery, bringing the blazing torpedo boat to a standstill, and causing her to cease fire. The British destroyers lowered boats to rescue V187s crew, but V187s crew, believing that the British were attempting to board the torpedo boat, fired on Goshawk. The British destroyers then re-opened fire on V187 which sank at about 10:10 hr. The boats of the British destroyers started to pick up V187s crew, but these  rescue operations were interrupted by the arrival of the German cruiser Stettin. Two of Defenders boats had to be left behind, carrying 28 survivors of V187s crew and 10 British sailors. Later in the day, the British submarine  surfaced by the two boats. She took off the British sailors and three of the Germans, but had no room for the remaining members of V187s crew, and so gave them food and water and a course for Heligoland. 24 of V187s crew were killed, with 14 wounded and 33 taken prisoner by the British.

References

Torpedo boats of the Imperial German Navy
World War I torpedo boats of Germany
Ships built in Stettin
1911 ships
Maritime incidents in August 1914
World War I shipwrecks in the North Sea